The Omar Ibn Al-Khatab Mosque (Mesquita Foz Do Iguaçu) is a mosque located at Foz do Iguaçu, Paraná, Brazil. It is situated in the city near the Iguaçu Falls. 

The mosque was inaugurated on 23 March 1983 featuring a beautiful exterior design painted in uniform white color.  Its architecture was inspired by Al-Aqsa Mosque, in Jerusalem. The mosque is named after Omar Ibn Al-Khatab a pious companion of the Islamic prophet Muhammad. Outside the mosque are tall two minaret towers from which the Muslim call to prayer (Adaan) is sounded five times each day which gathers the faithful for congregational prayers in the spacious main hall.

The interior of the mosque is more beautiful than the outside. There is a spacious main prayer hall which covers 400m² of the total built area of 600 m2. In the main prayer hall, there is a beautiful Mihrab built into the back wall of the mosque. The beautifully decorated Mihrab of the mosque indicates the direction to the Holy Mosque of Mecca in Saudi Arabia, where all Muslims are required to face when they perform their prayers.

Gallery

See also
  List of mosques in the Americas
  Lists of mosques 
 Islam in Brazil
 List of mosques in Brazill

References

External links 

 at CCBI - Centro Cultural Beneficente Islâmico de Foz do Iguaçu's site.

Omar Ibn Al-Khatab
Mosques completed in 1983
1983 establishments in Brazil
Religious buildings and structures in Paraná (state)
Foz do Iguaçu